Anolis brevirostris, the desert gracile anole or shortnose anole, is a species of lizard in the family Dactyloidae. The species is found in Hispaniola.

References

Anoles
Reptiles of Haiti
Reptiles of the Dominican Republic
Reptiles described in 1870
Taxa named by Marie Firmin Bocourt